George William of Brandenburg-Bayreuth (German: Georg Wilhelm; 16 November 1678 in Bayreuth – 18 December 1726 in Bayreuth) was a member of the House of Hohenzollern and Margrave of Brandenburg-Bayreuth.

Family
He was the first son of Christian Ernst, Margrave of Brandenburg-Bayreuth by his second wife, Sophie Louise of Württemberg-Stuttgart, the fifth of six children. Two sisters died in infancy before his own birth, and his only brother, born in 1679, lived only five months. Of his two surviving sisters, the eldest, Christiane Eberhardine, became the wife of August II the Strong, Elector of Saxony and King of Poland, and the youngest, Eleonore Magdalene, married a distant kinsman, Hermann Frederick, Count of Hohenzollern-Hechingen.

Life
George William succeeded his father as margrave of Bayreuth when he died on 20 May 1712. He pursued a military career due to a lack of academic aptitude and participated successfully on the imperial side in numerous battles. In this connection, he was seriously hit by a musket ball near Landau, a wound that never healed completely. In his youth, before acceding to the margraviate, he created the suburb of Sankt Georgen. It was intended to be a self-contained city (today in the district of Bayreuth) built in baroque style with a castle in the lake. In the artificially-created Brandenburg Pond (German: Brandenburger Weiher), fed by the Steinach tributary, he installed a ski jump and organized naval battles with real ships. On 17 November 1705, he created the Order of the Red Eagle (German: Roter Adlerorden), then known as the Ordre de la Sincérité, and celebrated the anniversary of its foundation every year with splendid festivities. The Order of the Red Eagle also possessed its own church, the Sophienkirche. 18th-century coats of arms of the Order are displayed there to this day.

The margrave was an enthusiastic hunter who built the Emperor's Hunting Seat (German: Kaiserhammer) and the Thiergarten. In addition, he is considered the builder of the Hermitage Museum and Schloss Neustädtlein. As margrave, he expanded the armed forces substantially.

Marriage and issue
In Leipzig on 16 October 1699 George William married Sophie of Saxe-Weissenfels. They had five children:

Christiane Sophie Wilhelmine (b. Bayreuth, 6 January 1701 - d. Kulmbach, 15 July 1749). The only surviving child of her parents, she was involved in a scandal that led to the birth of twins born out of wedlock.  Both died shortly after their birth in 1724. For her indiscretion, she was banished to her uncle's court in Kulmbach, where she died, unmarried and childless, twenty-five years later. Before her departure from her father's court, was allowed to imbed her petschaft (a necklace with a seal) in the wall of her room in the Schloss Himmelkron. In 1977 this object was finally found and is now displayed in the Museum of the Collegiate Church of Bayreuth (Stiftskirchenmuseum).
Eberhardine Elisabeth (b. Bayreuth, 13 January 1706 - d. Bayreuth, 3 October 1709).
Christian William (b. Bayreuth, 14 November 1706 - d. Bayreuth, 16 November 1706).
Christian Frederick William (b. Bayreuth, 7 June 1709 - d. Bayreuth, 9 June 1709).
Francis Adolph William (b. and d. Bayreuth, 7 June 1709), Christian's twin.

Devastated by the tragedy surrounding his beloved daughter, George William suffered a fatal decline in his health and died only two years later. Without surviving male issue, he was succeeded by his cousin George Frederick Charles, Margrave of Kulmbach.

Ancestors

References

Bayreuth, George William, Margrave of
Bayreuth, George William, Margrave of
Margraves of Bayreuth
Generals of the Holy Roman Empire
Recipients of the Order of the White Eagle (Poland)